The First Lady is a British television series produced by the BBC in 1968 and 1969.

The series starred Thora Hird as crusading local councillor Sarah Danby and was set around the fictional borough of Furness in Lancashire. Capitalising on the popularity of its lead actress, The First Lady was a down-to-earth series exploring the inner workings of local government.

Due to the BBC's wiping policy of the era, the series mostly no longer exists in the BBC archives, with only one complete episode that is known to exist.

Cast
Thora Hird as Sarah Danby (39 episodes, 1968–1969) 
Henry Knowles as Tom Danby (38 episodes, 1968–1969) 
Robert Keegan as Will Tarrant (38 episodes, 1968–1969) 
James Grout as George Kingston (38 episodes, 1968–1969) 
Margaret John as Margaret Kingston (8 episodes, 1968–1969) 
Donald Layne-Smith as Alderman Bowland (4 episodes, 1968–1969) 
Pamela Craig as Betty (3 episodes, 1968–1969) 
George A. Cooper as Fred Glossop (3 episodes, 1968–1969)

References

External links
 

BBC television dramas
Lost BBC episodes
1960s British drama television series
1968 British television series debuts
1969 British television series endings
Black-and-white British television shows
English-language television shows